In England, Scotland, Wales, and Ireland, and the British colonies, there has historically been a succession of Witchcraft Acts governing witchcraft and providing penalties for its practice, or—in later years—rather for pretending to practise it.

Witchcraft Act 1541

Religious tensions in England during the 16th and 17th centuries resulted in the introduction of serious penalties for witchcraft. Henry VIII's Act of 1541 (33 Hen. VIII c. 8) was the first to define witchcraft as a felony, a crime punishable by death and the forfeiture of goods and chattels. It was forbidden to:

The Act also removed the benefit of clergy, a legal device that exempted the accused from the jurisdiction of the King's courts, from those convicted of witchcraft. This statute was repealed by Henry's son, Edward VI, in 1547.

Witchcraft Act 1562

An 1562 Act Against Conjurations, Enchantments and Witchcrafts (5 Eliz. I c. 16) was passed early in the reign of Elizabeth I. It was in some respects more merciful towards those found guilty of witchcraft than its predecessor, demanding the death penalty only where harm had been caused; lesser offences were punishable by a term of imprisonment. The Act provided that anyone who should "use, practise, or exercise any Witchcraft, Enchantment, Charm, or Sorcery, whereby any person shall happen to be killed or destroyed", was guilty of a felony without benefit of clergy, and was to be put to death.

Indictments for homicide caused by witchcraft begin to appear in the historical record in the period following the passage of the 1563 Act. Out of the 1,158 homicide victims identified in the surviving records, 228 or 20.6% were suspected of being killed by witchcraft. By comparison, poison was suspected in only 31 of the cases. Out of the 157 people accused of killing with witchcraft, roughly half were acquitted. Only nine of the accused were men.

Scottish Witchcraft Act 1563

Under the Scottish Witchcraft Act 1563 both the practice of witchcraft and consulting with witches were capital offences. This Act stayed on Scottish statute books until repealed as a result of a House of Lords amendment to the bill for the post-union Witchcraft Act 1735.

Witchcraft Act 1603

In 1603, the year James I's accession to the English throne, the Elizabethan Act was broadened by Edward Coke and others to bring the penalty of death without benefit of clergy to any one who invoked evil spirits or communed with familiar spirits. The Act's full title was An Act against Conjuration, Witchcraft and dealing with evil and wicked spirits, (1 Ja. I c. 12). It was this statute that was enforced by Matthew Hopkins, the self-styled Witch-Finder General.

The Acts of Elizabeth and James changed the law of witchcraft by making it a felony, thus removing the accused from the jurisdiction of the ecclesiastical courts to the courts of common law. This provided, at least, that the accused persons theoretically enjoyed the benefits of ordinary criminal procedure. Burning at the stake was eliminated except in cases of witchcraft that were also petty treason; most convicted were hanged instead. Any witch who had committed a minor witchcraft offence (punishable by one year in prison) and was accused and found guilty a second time was sentenced to death.

Colonial use

The Witchcraft Act 1603 was employed in the British American colonies, e.g., in the trial of Margaret Mattson, a woman accused of witchcraft in the Province of Pennsylvania.  (She was acquitted by William Penn after trial in Philadelphia in 1683.)

Scottish Witchcraft Act 1649
Through the 1640s the General Assembly of the Church of Scotland and the Commission of the Kirk lobbied for the enforcement and extension of the Witchcraft Act 1563, which had been the basis of previous witch trials. The Covenanter regime passed a series of acts to enforce godliness in 1649, which made capital offences of blasphemy, the worship of false gods and for beaters and cursers of their parents. They also passed a new witchcraft act that ratified the existing act of 1563 and extended it to deal with consulters of "Devils and familiar spirits", who would now be punished with death.

Witchcraft Act 1735

The Witchcraft Act of 1735 (9 Geo. 2 c. 5) marked a complete reversal in attitudes. Penalties for the practice of witchcraft as traditionally constituted, which by that time was considered by many influential figures to be an impossible crime, were replaced by penalties for the pretence of witchcraft. A person who claimed to have the power to call up spirits, or foretell the future, or cast spells, or discover the whereabouts of stolen goods, was to be punished as a vagrant and a con artist, subject to fines and imprisonment. The Act applied to the whole of Great Britain, repealing both the 1563 Scottish Act and the 1604 English Act.

The Witchcraft Act of 1735 remained in force in Britain well into the 20th century, until its eventual repeal with the enactment of the Fraudulent Mediums Act of 1951.

The Fraudulent Mediums Act 1951 was repealed on 26 May 2008 by new Consumer Protection Regulations following an EU directive targeting unfair sales and marketing practices.

Other related acts
 The Witchcraft Suppression Act, 1957 of South Africa, which is still in force, was based on the Witchcraft Act 1735.
 An Act, Against Conjuration, Witchcraft, and Dealing with Evil and Wicked Spirits, passed by the Massachusetts Bay Colony General Court, October 1692.

See also
 Bideford witch trial: Trial of the last three people known to have been executed in England for alleged witchcraft, in 1682.
 Janet Horne: The last person to be legally executed for witchcraft in the British Isles, in 1727.
 Helen Duncan: The last person to be imprisoned under the Witchcraft Act 1735, in 1944. Her conviction led to the repeal of the Act and the introduction of the Fraudulent Mediums Act 1951.
 Margaret Mattson: A woman accused of witchcraft in the Province of Pennsylvania; acquitted by William Penn after trial in Philadelphia in 1683.

References
Notes

Citations

Bibliography

Further reading
 John Newton and Jo Bath (eds), Witchcraft and the Act of 1604 (Leiden, Brill, 2008) (Studies in Medieval and Reformation Traditions, 131)
 P G Maxwell-Stuart, The Great Scottish Witch-Hunt (Tempus, Stroud, 2007)

Great Britain Acts of Parliament 1735
 
Witch trials in England
Witch trials in Scotland